"The Mystery of Thirteen" was an American television play broadcast in 1957 as part of the CBS television series Playhouse 90. Jack Lemmon starred as the notorious English physician, William Palmer, who was suspected of 13 murders and was hanged in 1856 for poisoning a close friend. Margaret O'Brien co-starred, David Shaw wrote the teleplay, and Robert Mulligan directed.

Plot

The play is based on the real-life story of an English physician, William Palmer, also known as the "Prince of Poisoners". Palmer was accused of murdering numerous persons, including his own brother and children, and was ultimately hanged for poisoning a close friend. Charles Dickens called Palmer "the greatest villain that ever stood in the Old Bailey".

Cast

The following performers received screen credit for their performances:

 Jack Lemmon – Dr. Billy Palmer
 Margaret O'Brien – Annie Brookes
 Herbert Marshall – Dr. Knight
 Gladys Cooper – Mrs. Palmer
 Henry Jones – Walter Palmer
 John Baragrey – John Parsons Cook
 Romney Brent

Production
The production was broadcast live from CBS Television City in Hollywood on October 24, 1957, as part of the second season of the CBS television series Playhouse 90. David Shaw wrote the teleplay, as an adaptation of Robert Graves' best-selling novel, They Hanged My Saintly Billy. Robert Mulligan directed, and Martin Manulis was the producer. Jack Lemmon, Margaret O'Brien, and Herbert Marshall starred.

Reception
Time magazine opined that the sympathetic portrayal of a criminal broke new ground on TV, but proved to be "cold, cold ground." The reviewer concluded that Lemmon's charm and skill could not make the protagonist palatable. Lacking either satire or intrigue, Time found that it "amounted to a catalogue of crime with little more dramatic point or development than the police blotter."

References

1957 television plays
1957 American television episodes
Playhouse 90 (season 2) episodes